Lioptilodes ockendeni is a species of moth in the genus Lioptilodes known from Bolivia and Peru. Moths of this species take flight in March, June and August and have a wingspan of approximately 34–37 millimetres.

References

Platyptiliini
Moths described in 1996
Taxa named by Cees Gielis